Club Deportivo Palmaflor del Trópico, best known as Palmaflor del Trópico, is a Bolivian football club based in Villa Tunari, in the Cochabamba Tropic. Founded in 2008, it plays in the Bolivian Primera División after being promoted for the 2020 season by winning the Copa Simón Bolívar the previous season.

The club was named Municipal Vinto until 2019, and Club Atlético Palmaflor until the end of 2022.

History
The club was founded on 10 September 2008 as Club Municipal Vinto and was entered into the Cochabamba Football Association. After some seasons in the lower tiers of the regional football association, the club started experiencing financial problems which in 2017 led to its sale to a group of entrepreneurs hailing from Inquisivi Province in La Paz Department who had settled in Quillacollo.

The club was moved from Vinto to Quillacollo by its new owners and earned promotion to the AFC's Primera A in 2018 by winning the Primera B championship. In the first championship of the 2019 Primera A season, Municipal Vinto finished as runners-up after losing the final to Arauco Prado but managed to qualify for the Copa Simón Bolívar. Previous to the start of that competition, the club initiated the legal process before the Bolivian Football Federation to rename itself to Atlético Palmaflor, in honor to the owners' roots in La Paz.

In the 2019 Copa Simón Bolívar, Municipal Vinto managed to advance out of the group stage by winning all of its matches. In the following stage they were drawn against Real Santa Cruz, losing one match and winning the other, and then losing on penalties. Nevertheless, the club qualified for the semifinals as lucky loser and in that stage faced Deportivo FATIC from the department of La Paz. The first leg was won by Municipal Vinto by a score of 4–0, while the second leg in El Alto ended in a draw that qualified the club for the final. In the final, Municipal Vinto once again played against Real Santa Cruz, this time winning both legs (1–0 in Santa Cruz de la Sierra and 2–0 in Quillacollo) and securing its first ever promotion to the División Profesional, and also becoming the first team based in Quillacollo to play in the Bolivian top flight in 41 years, after Bata.

In their first season in the top flight, Palmaflor managed to qualify for an international competition for the first time ever, drawing with San José on the final matchday to finish in eighth place and qualify for the 2021 Copa Sudamericana. In that campaign, the team was managed by Humberto Viviani and Xabier Azkargorta, who replaced Viviani for the final rounds of the tournament.

On 16 November 2022, after another qualification to the Copa Sudamericana, Palmaflor went from Quillacollo to the Cochabamba Tropic, with former president of Bolivia Evo Morales being one of the board members. On 3 December, the club's Facebook revealed their new name, Club Deportivo Palmaflor del Trópico, and released a new logo the following day; a day later, however, the logo was removed and labelled as "unofficial".

Current squad

Honours

Domestic
Copa Simón Bolívar:
Winners (1): 2019

AFC Primera A:
Runners-up (1): 2019-A

AFC Primera B:
Winners (1): 2018

References

Football clubs in Bolivia
Association football clubs established in 2008
2008 establishments in Bolivia